UserJoy Technology Co., Ltd. is a Taiwanese video game development and publishing company. The company was founded in 1995 in Taipei, Taiwan, and publishes worldwide.

History

Just developers
UserJoy was founded in May 1995. UserJoy Technology develops games for the PC, mostly including MMORPGs. Its 2003 Fantasia Sango series received Gamestar Awards when it was released, and outside China, Hong Kong, and Taiwan, was published by Nihon Falcom.

UserJoy's Angel Love Online was published in Japan in 2006, followed by other countries. Its The Legend of Three Kingdoms Online was commercially launched in 2006, and then by Userjoy Japan in Japan in January 2008.

Publishing industry
In 2007, Userjoy went from being a game developer to also a game publisher, meaning that it began licensing games by other companies instead of just launching its own self-developed games. For example, it licensed Concerto Gate Online by Square Enix in China and other countries. In 2007, Userjoy jointly developed Angel Love Online PLAYSTATION 3 version with Q Entertainment Inc., to provide the first PS3 MMORPG. UserJoy's Field of Honor is a casual online game launched in January 2008.

On April 18, 2008, Userjoy, or USERJOY, went public on the GreTai Securities Market under the stock symbol 3546. In 2009, most of its revenue came from its online game business, at around 98 percent. In Asia's 200 Best Under A Billion article put out by Forbes in 2011, this company ranked 13 in net income, 16 in operating income, 46 in sales, and 81 in market value. In 2009, it was the second top performer of stocks traded on the GreTai Securities Market. In 2011, it was one of the more profitable Taiwan stock. In 2011, UserJoy began producing the free-to-play MMO version of the Ninety-Nine Nights along with Q Entertainment.

Newer games
The Legend of Heroes: Akatsuki no Kiseki was first announced in 2014 as a project combining UserJoy and Falcom to commemorate the tenth anniversary of the Trails series. Though UserJoy rose to fame mainly for PC MMORPGs such as Angel Love Online and The Legend of Three Kingdoms Online, and later began branching out into mobile games.

Developed games

Online

Offline

Published games

References

External links
 

Taiwanese companies established in 1995
Companies based in Taipei
Video game companies of Taiwan
Video game companies established in 1995